LS7 may refer to:

Vehicles
 General Motors LS7, a small-block V8 gasoline engine
 Hongqi LS7, a 2022–present Chinese full-size luxury SUV
 IM LS7, a 2021 Chinese electric mid-size SUV concept
 Rolladen-Schneider LS7, a 1988–1993 German high-performance single-seat sailplane

Other uses
 CS/LS7, a Chinese submachine gun